David Carr (31 January 1957 – 19 June 2005) was an English professional footballer. He played in both defence and midfield for a number of English professional and semi-professional sides.

Carr, born in Aylesham, Kent, began his senior football career with Margate, making his debut aged 15 in a Kent Floodlight Cup game at Hastings United. He joined Luton Town as an apprentice in January 1973 (Luton paying Margate £2000 as a transfer fee) and turned professional in January 1975. After 43 games, all in Division Two he joined Colin Murphy's Lincoln City for £20,500 in July 1979. Over the next three seasons he missed only one game, and helped Lincoln to promotion from Division Four.

In August 1983 he moved to Torquay United, managed by Bruce Rioch,  on a free transfer. He played 40 games that season before being released by new Torquay manager David Webb.

After his release he joined Maidstone United, later playing for Dover Athletic, and  Folkestone Invicta before joining Thanet United in the 1987 close-season. In July 1988 he moved to Hythe Town as player-coach, taking over as player-manager in November 1989. He later played for Sittingbourne before finishing his career back at Margate in the 1992–93 season.

Carr died from cancer in June 2005, at the age of 48.

References

1957 births
2005 deaths
People from Aylesham
English footballers
Margate F.C. players
Luton Town F.C. players
Lincoln City F.C. players
Torquay United F.C. players
Maidstone United F.C. players
Dover Athletic F.C. players
Folkestone Invicta F.C. players
Hythe Town F.C. players
Hythe Town F.C. managers
Sittingbourne F.C. players
Association football defenders
Deaths from cancer in England
English football managers
People from Dover, Kent
Sportspeople from Dover, Kent
People educated at Dover Grammar School for Boys